"Pretty Boy Swag" is a song by American rapper Soulja Boy, released as the first single from his third studio album The DeAndre Way (2010). It features production from G5 Kids, who helped to write the song along with Soulja Boy.

In popular culture
The song became a meme in early 2019, on the video-sharing platform TikTok. As part of the "Pretty Boy Swag transformation meme", users upload short videos of themselves where they "transform into their favourite pop culture figures".  According to Mashable India, during the song's build up, users don pieces of costumes and assume position. When the beat drops during the chorus, they "cut to whatever obscure object they dressed as".

Charts

Weekly charts

Year-end charts

Radio and release history

References

2010 singles
2010 songs
Soulja Boy songs
Songs written by Soulja Boy
Interscope Records singles
Internet memes introduced in 2019
Music videos directed by Dale Resteghini